Hugh M. Burns (February 25, 1902 – November 26, 1988) was an American politician. He served as a Democratic member for the 36th district of the California State Assembly. He also served as a member for the 16th and 30th district of the California State Senate.

Life and career 
Burns was a mortician.

In 1937, Burns was elected to represent the 36th district of the California State Assembly, serving until 1943. In the same year, he was elected to represent the 30th district of the California State Senate, serving until 1967, when he was elected to represent the 16th district, serving until 1971.

Burns died in November 1988 at his home in Sacramento, California, at the age of 86.

References 

1902 births
1988 deaths
Democratic Party members of the California State Assembly
Democratic Party California state senators
20th-century American politicians